Basta may refer to:

Places 
 Basta, Astrakhan Oblast, Russia
 Basta, Greece, now Kryoneri
 Basta, Shetland, Scotland
 Basta, Jordan
 Basta (archaeological site), prehistoric archaeological site
 Bașta, Romania, a village in Secuieni, Neamț

People 
 Basta (rapper) (born 1980), Russian rapper
 BASta!, solo moniker for Joris Vanvinckenroye
 Adrian Basta (born 1988), Polish footballer
 Dušan Basta (born 1984), Serbian footballer
 Giorgio Basta (1544–1607), Italian general
 Jan Bašta (1860–1936), Czech engineer
 Jaroslav Bašta (born 1948), Czech politician and diplomat
 Ricardo Basta, Argentinian-American jewelry designer

Art, entertainment, and media
 Basta (album), a 1969 album by Quilapayún
 Basta, a fictional character in the Inkheart series by Cornelia Funke
 Basta (TV series), a Flemish program by Neveneffecten
 Basta (film), a 2021 Indian Marathi-language film

Other uses 
 Basta (herbicide) or glufosinate, a herbicide
 Basta (Odisha Vidhan Sabha constituency), assembly constituency of Odisha, India
 Ianthella basta, a sponge of family Ianthellidae
 ¡Ya basta!, roughly 'Enough is enough!' in Spanish
 Basta! (coalition), Portuguese political coalition
 Basta (São Tomé and Príncipe), São Tomé and Príncipe political party
The Sudanese Arabic term for baklava

See also 
 
 Bastar (disambiguation)